The 1870 Southwark by-election was fought on 17 February 1870.  The by-election was fought due to the resignation (Ambassador to Spain) of the incumbent MP of the Liberal Party, Austen Henry Layard.  It was won by the Conservative candidate Marcus Beresford.

References

Southwark by-election
Southwark,1870
Southwark by-election
Southwark,1870